Soner Yalçın (born January 1, 1966) is a Turkish journalist and writer. The co-founder of the news website odatv, he was arrested in February 2011 along with other odatv journalists and charged with links to the Ergenekon organization. He was released pending trial in December 2012.

Journalistic career 
Soner Yalçın is an investigative journalist specialized in reporting about the deep state in Turkey. He began working in 1987 for the center left-wing periodical called 2000'e Doğru (Towards 2000) as a permanent political correspondent in Ankara. In 1990, he was appointed as the chief of intelligence reporting of the newspaper. From 1993 to 1994, he worked as news director for the daily Aydınlık (Enlightenment), which is today the official newspaper of the İşçi Partisi but not at the time of Yalçın's involvement. After the split of the Aydınlık group, the forced ban during the 1980 Turkish coup d'état, Aydınlık has been relaunched as a left-wing daily in 1990 not only supported by the İşçi Partisi but also by intellectuals and writers not affiliated to this party. Like others, Soner Yalçın was working for Aydınlık considered at that time as a broader project and he was not a member of this party. He definitely left this newspaper in 1995. Aydınlık became now the official newspaper of the İşçi Partisi.

After that episode, Soner Yalçın briefly worked for the newspaper Siyah – Beyaz (Black - White) published by Doğan Yurdakul before starting a new career in television in 1996 for Show TV. He began as a television investigative reporter based in Ankara. The same year, he was hired by Star TV where he worked as the general news manager. Later CNN Türk asked Soner Yalçın and Cüneyt Özdemir to prepare a new television program called 5N1K. With journalist Barış Pehlivan, Soner Yalçın produced a number of political documentaries called Oradaydim ("I was there") broadcast by CNN Türk. Since February 4, 2007, he was working a columnist for the Sunday editions of the daily Hürriyet. End 2007, he launched his own online news website called OdaTV.

Experienced writer 
Beside his journalistic activities, Soner Yalçın is also a prominent and popular writer. He wrote several critical essays and investigation about the controversial role of Turkish governmental intelligence organization, the existence of a Turkish branch of Operation Gladio, the Counter-Guerrilla, the relations between the Turkish mafia and state officials, the tactics and the networks of global Islamist movements (especially the US network of the Gülen movement) and some historical analysis about the Turkish-Ottoman identity. The usual style of this writer is to explain the reader that reality is not usually as it appears, the truth is sometimes hidden and a conscientious reader should look for it.

Written in prison, his last publication Samizdat (2012) speaks about the freedom of the press and the freedom of expression in Turkey. It gets back to the context of his 29 first days in prison and ends with his 395th day. It gives extensive details about his own bill of indictment, explains the situation for other Ergenekon detainees and criticize the role of mainstream media.

OdaTV case 
Yalçın co-founded the news website odatv in 2007. He was arrested in February 2011 along with other odatv journalists and charged with links to the Ergenekon organization. He was released pending trial in December 2012.

According to the prosecution, Soner Yalçın is a leading member of this clandestine terrorist organization which was allegedly preparing a Turkish secularist military coup against the current Turkish government. According to the arrested journalist, a pro-Gülen movement clandestine network within the Turkish police hacked his computer and falsified the documents in order to put in jail him and his colleagues working for OdaTV.

Bibliography 
in Turkish

 Samizdat Hakikatlere Dayanacak Gücünüz Var mi. Kirmizi Kedi Yayinlari, Istanbul 2012, .
 Bu Dinciler O Müslümanlara Benzemiyor. Doğan Kitapçılık, İstanbul 2009, .
 Siz Kimi Kandırıyorsunuz! Doğan Kitapçılık, İstanbul 2008, .
 Efendi 2: Beyaz Müslümanların Büyük Sırrı. Doğan Kitapçılık, İstanbul 2006
 Efendi: Beyaz Türklerin Büyük Sırrı. Doğan Kitapçılık, İstanbul 2004, .
 Behçet Cantürk'ün Anıları. Doğan Kitapçılık, İstanbul 2003, . - on Behçet Cantürk
 (with Doğan Yurdakul) Reis - Gladio'nun Türk tetikçisi. Doğan Kitapçılık, İstanbul 2003, . - on Abdullah Çatlı
 Binbaşı Ersever'in İtirafları. Doğan Kitapçılık, İstanbul 2003, . - on the assassination of Ahmet Cem Ersever
 (with Mehmet Ali Birand) The Özal: Bir Davanın Öyküsü. Doğan Kitapçılık, İstanbul 2001, . - on the life and death of Turgut Özal, and related history
 Teşkilat'ın İki Silahşoru - Biri Meşrutiyet'in Silahşoru Dede Yakub Cemil Diğeri Cumhuriyet'in Silahşoru Torun "Yakub Cemil". Doğan Kitapçılık, İstanbul 2001, .
 (with Doğan Yurdakul) Bay Pipo - Bir MİT Görevlisinin Sıradışı Yaşamı: Hiram Abas Doğan Kitapçılık, İstanbul 1999, . - on Hiram Abas
 Hangi Erbakan? Doğan Kitapçılık, Öteki Yayınevi, Ankara 1996, .
 Kayıp Sicil - Erdogan Erdoğan'ın Çalınan Dosyası Kirmizi Kedi, Istanbul 2014 .

See also
List of arrested journalists in Turkey

References

External links
 Selected extracts from Yalçın's writings, translated into English

1966 births
Living people
Turkish journalists
People from Çorum
Imprisoned journalists
Hacettepe University alumni
Inmates of Silivri Prison
Journalists imprisoned in Turkey
Sözcü people